Bergrothomyia is an Australian genus of crane fly in the family Limoniidae.

Species
B. diemenensis Alexander, 1928
B. rostrifera (Skuse, 1890)
B. tregellasi Alexander, 1931

References

Limoniidae
Nematocera genera